This list presents notable law reviews concerned with international law and related fields.

See also
List of law journals
Law

 
International Law